The Raytheon Company was a major U.S. defense contractor and industrial corporation with manufacturing concentrations in weapons and military and commercial electronics. It was previously involved in corporate and special-mission aircraft until early 2007. Raytheon was the world's largest producer of guided missiles. In April 2020, the company merged with United Technologies Corporation to form Raytheon Technologies.

Established in 1922, the company reincorporated in 1928 and adopted its present name in 1959. During 2018, the company had around 67,000 employees worldwide and annual revenues of approximately US$25.35 billion. More than 90% of Raytheon's revenues were obtained from military contracts and, as of 2012, it was the fifth-largest military contractor in the world. , it was the third largest defense contractor in the United States by defense revenue.

In 2003, Raytheon's headquarters moved from Lexington, Massachusetts, to Waltham, Massachusetts. The company had previously been headquartered in Cambridge, Massachusetts, from 1922 to 1928, Newton, Massachusetts, from 1928 to 1941, Waltham from 1941 to 1961 and Lexington from 1961 to 2003.

History

Early years
In 1922, two former Tufts University School of Engineering, roommates Laurence K. Marshall and Vannevar Bush, along with scientist Charles G. Smith, founded the American Appliance Company in Cambridge, Massachusetts. Its focus, which was originally on new refrigeration technology, soon shifted to electronics. The company's first product was a gaseous (helium) voltage-regulator tube that was based on Charles Smith's earlier astronomical research of the star Zeta Puppis. The electron tube was christened with the name Raytheon (a compound of Old French and Greek meaning 'light from the gods') and was used in a battery eliminator, a type of radio-receiver power supply that plugged into the power grid in place of large batteries. This made it possible to convert household alternating current to a regulated, high voltage direct current for radios and thus eliminate the need for expensive, short-lived batteries.

In 1925, the company changed its name to Raytheon Manufacturing Company and began marketing its rectifier, under the Raytheon brand name, with commercial success. In 1928 Raytheon merged with Q.R.S. Company, an American manufacturer of electron tubes and switches, to form the successor of the same name, Raytheon Manufacturing Company.  By the 1930s, it had already grown to become one of the world's largest vacuum tube manufacturing companies. In 1933 it diversified by acquiring Acme-Delta Company, a producer of transformers, power equipment, and electronic auto parts.

During World War II
Early in World War II, physicists in the United Kingdom invented the magnetron, a specialized microwave-generating electron tube that markedly improved the capability of radar to detect enemy aircraft. American companies were then sought by the US government to perfect and mass-produce the magnetron for ground-based, airborne, and shipborne radar systems, and, with support from the Massachusetts Institute of Technology's Radiation Laboratory (recently formed to investigate microwave radar), Raytheon received a contract to build the devices. Within a few months of being awarded the contract, Raytheon had already begun to mass manufacture magnetron tubes for use in radar sets and then complete radar systems. At war's end in 1945 the company was responsible for about 80 percent of all magnetrons manufactured. During the war Raytheon also pioneered the production of shipboard radar systems, particularly for submarine detection. Raytheon ranked 71st among United States corporations in the value of World War II military production contracts.

Raytheon's research on the magnetron tube revealed the potential of microwaves to cook food. In 1945, Raytheon's Percy Spencer invented the microwave oven by discovering that the magnetron could rapidly heat food. In 1947, the company demonstrated the Radarange microwave oven for commercial use.

Raytheon was also a contractor for the mass-production of the newly-invented miniature shock-resistant vacuum tubes used in proximity fuses. These tubes were difficult to manufacture and required rigorous attention to detail to avoid failure of the fuse.

After World War II
In 1946, the company expanded its electronics capability through acquisitions that included the Submarine Signal Company (founded in 1901), a leading manufacturer of maritime safety equipment. With its broadened capabilities, Raytheon developed the first guidance system for a missile that could intercept a flying target. In 1948 Charles Francis Adams IV was appointed to be the new President of the company and served until 1960. In 1948, Raytheon began to manufacture guided missiles. In 1950, its Lark missile became the first such weapon to destroy a target aircraft in flight. Raytheon then received military contracts to develop the air-to-air Sparrow and ground-to-air Hawk missiles, projects that received impetus from the Korean War. In later decades, it remained a major producer of missiles, such as the Patriot antimissile missile and the air-to-air Phoenix missile.

Raytheon made a foray into computers, producing the RAYDAC computer for the U.S.Navy which became operational in 1953. "Unfortunately, the machine was technically obsolete by the time it was operational." Also in 1953 the company began work on a follow-on, the RAYCOM, which was never completed. In 1954 it entered into a joint venture with Honeywell to form the Datamatic corporation. However it sold its interest to Honeywell a year later, before introduction of the DATAmatic 1000 system.

In 1958, Raytheon acquired the marine electronics company Applied Electronics Company, which significantly increased its strength in commercial marine navigation and radio gear, as well as less-expensive Japanese suppliers of products such as marine/weather band radios and direction-finding gear. In the same year, it changed its name to Raytheon Company.

During the post-war years, Raytheon also made generally low- to medium-powered radio and television transmitters and related equipment for the commercial market, but the high-powered market was solidly in the hands of larger, better-financed competitors such as Continental Electronics, General Electric and Radio Corporation of America.

In the 1950s, Raytheon began manufacturing transistors, including the CK722, priced and marketed to hobbyists.

In 1961, the British electronics company A.C. Cossor merged with Raytheon, following its sale by Philips. The new Company's name was Raytheon Cossor. The Cossor side of the organisation is still current in the Raytheon group .

In 1965, it acquired Amana Refrigeration, Inc., a manufacturer of refrigerators and air conditioners. Using the Amana brand name and its distribution channels, Raytheon began selling the first countertop household microwave oven in 1967 and became a dominant manufacturer in the microwave oven business.

In 1966, the company entered the educational publishing business with the acquisition of D.C. Heath and Company, marketing an influential physics textbook developed by the Physical Science Study Committee. Raytheon also manufactured the Apollo Guidance Computer, which was introduced that year and flew aboard all NASA Project Apollo missions.

In the late 1970s, Raytheon acquired McGraw-Edison's appliances division notable for the Speed Queen line of washers and dryers.

1980s
In 1980, Raytheon acquired Beech Aircraft Corporation, a leading manufacturer of general aviation aircraft founded in 1932 by Walter H. Beech. In 1993 the company expanded its aircraft activities by adding the Hawker line of business jets by acquiring Corporate Jets Inc., the business jet product line of British Aerospace (now BAE Systems). These two entities were merged in 1994 to become the Raytheon Aircraft Company. In the first quarter of 2007 Raytheon sold its aircraft operations, which subsequently operated as Hawker Beechcraft, and since 2014 have been units of Textron Aviation. The product line of Raytheon's aircraft subsidiary included business jets such as the Hawker 800XP and Hawker 4000, the Beechjet 400A, and the Premier I; the popular King Air series of twin turboprops; and piston-engine aircraft such as the Bonanza. Its special-mission aircraft included the single-turboprop T-6A Texan II, which the United States Air Force and United States Navy had chosen as their primary training aircraft.

1990s
In 1991, during the Persian Gulf War, Raytheon's Patriot missile received great international exposure, resulting in a substantial increase in sales for the company outside the United States. In an effort to establish leadership in the defense electronics business, Raytheon purchased in quick succession Dallas-based E-Systems (1995); Chrysler Corporation's defense electronics and aircraft-modification businesses, which had previously acquired companies such as Electrospace systems (1996) (portions of these businesses were later sold to L-3 Communications), and the defense unit of Texas Instruments, Defense Systems & Electronics Group (1997). Also in 1997, Raytheon acquired the aerospace and defense business of Hughes Aircraft Company from Hughes Electronics Corporation, a subsidiary of General Motors, which included a number of product lines previously purchased by Hughes Electronics, including the former General Dynamics missile business (Pomona facility), the defense portion of Delco Electronics (Delco Systems Operations), and Magnavox Electronic Systems. 

Raytheon also divested itself of several nondefense businesses in the 1990s, including Amana Refrigeration, Raytheon Commercial Laundry (purchased by Bain Capital's Alliance Laundry Systems), and Seismograph Service Ltd (sold to Schlumberger-Geco-Prakla). On October 12, 1999, Raytheon exited the personal rapid transit (PRT) business as it terminated its PRT 2000 system due to the high cost of development and the lack of interest.

2000s
In November 2007, Raytheon purchased Sarcos for an undisclosed sum, seeking to expand into robotics research and production.

In September 2009, Raytheon entered into an agreement to acquire BBN Technologies. The acquisition was completed on October 29, 2009.

2010s

In December 2010, Applied Signal Technology agreed to be acquired by Raytheon for $490 million.

In October 2014, Raytheon beat rivals Lockheed Martin and Northrop Grumman for a contract to build 3DELRR, a next-generation long-range radar system, for the US Air Force worth an estimated $1 billion.

The contract award was immediately protested by Raytheon's competitors, Lockheed Martin and Northrop Grumman. After re-evaluating the bids following the protests, the US Air Force  decided to delay awarding the 3DELRR EMD contract until 2017 and was to issue an amended solicitation at the end of July 2016. In 2017 the Air Force again awarded the contract to Raytheon.

In May 2015, Raytheon acquired cybersecurity firm Websense, Inc. from Vista Equity Partners for $1.9 billion and combined it with RCP, formerly part of its IIS segment to form Raytheon|Websense. In October 2015, Raytheon|Websense acquired Foreground Security, a provider of security operations centers, managed security service solutions and cybersecurity professional services, for $62 million. In January 2016, Raytheon|Websense acquired the firewall provider Stonesoft from Intel Security for an undisclosed amount and renamed itself to Forcepoint.

In July 2016, Poland's Defence Minister Antoni Macierewicz planned to sign a letter of intent with Raytheon for a $5.6 billion deal to upgrade its Patriot missile-defence shield.

In 2017, Saudi Arabia signed business deals worth billions of dollars with multiple American companies, including Raytheon.

In July 2019, Qatar's Ministry of Defense committed to acquire Raytheon’s NASAM and Patriot missile defense systems.

2020s
In February 2020, Raytheon completed the first radar antenna array for the US Army's new missile defense radar, known as the Lower Tier Air and Missile Defense Sensor (LTAMDS), to replace the service's Patriot air and missile defense system sensor.

In April 2020, the company merged with United Technologies Corporation to form Raytheon Technologies. The merged company is headquartered in Waltham rather than UTC's base in Farmington, Connecticut.

Finances 
For the fiscal year 2017, Raytheon reported earnings of US$2.024 billion, with an annual revenue of US$25.348 billion, an increase of 5.1% over the previous fiscal cycle. Raytheon's shares traded at over $164 per share, and its market capitalization was valued at over US$51.7 billion in November 2018.

Company structure

Businesses
Raytheon is composed of five major business divisions:
 Integrated Defense Systems—based in Tewksbury, Massachusetts; Ralph Acaba, President
 Intelligence, Information and Services—based in Dulles, Virginia; Dave Wajsgras, President
 Missile Systems—based in Tucson, Arizona; Wesley Kremer, President
 Space and Airborne Systems—based in McKinney, Texas; Roy Azevedo, President
 Forcepoint—based Austin, Texas; CEO, Matt Moynahan

Raytheon’s businesses are supported by several dedicated international operations including: Raytheon Australia; Raytheon Canada Limited; operations in Japan; Raytheon Microelectronics in Spain; Raytheon UK (formerly Raytheon Systems Limited); and ThalesRaytheonSystems, France.

Strategic Business Areas
In recent years, Raytheon has expanded into other fields while redefining some of its core business activities. Raytheon has identified five key 'Strategic Business Areas' where it is focusing its expertise and resources: 
 Homeland Security
 Missile Defense
 Precision Engagement
 Intelligence, Surveillance, Reconnaissance (ISR)
 Process Improvement (Raytheon Lean6)

Leadership
In March 2014, Thomas Kennedy was named CEO of Raytheon Company. Kennedy succeeded William H. Swanson, who was CEO since 2003. Swanson remained as Chairman through September 2014 when Kennedy became Chairman as well as CEO. Other current and former members of the board of directors of Raytheon were: Vernon Clark, James E. Cartwright, John Deutch, Stephen J. Hadley, George R. Oliver, Frederic Poses, Michael Ruettgers, Ronald Skates, William Spivey, and Linda Stuntz.

Ownership
As of December 2014, according to filed reports, the top ten institutional shareholders of Raytheon are Wellington Management Company, Vanguard Group, State Street Corporation, Barrow, Hanley, Mewhinney & Strauss, BlackRock Institutional Trust Company, BlackRock Advisors, Bank of America, Bank of New York Mellon, Deutsche Bank and Macquarie Group.

Products and services

Overview

Raytheon provides electronics, mission systems integration and other capabilities in the areas of sensing; effects; and command, control, communications and intelligence systems; as well as a broad range of mission support services.

Raytheon's electronics and defense-systems units produce air-, sea-, and land-launched missiles, aircraft radar systems, weapons sights and targeting systems, communication and battle-management systems, and satellite components.

Air traffic control systems
FIRSTplus Air Traffic Control Simulator
AutoTrac III ATM System
STARS

Radars and sensors

Raytheon is a developer and manufacturer of radars (including AESAs), electro-optical sensors, and other advanced electronics systems for airborne, naval and ground based military applications. Examples include:
 APG-63/APG-70 radars for the F-15 Eagle
 APG-65/APG-73/APG-79 radars for the F/A-18 Hornet
 APG-77 radar for the F-22 Raptor (joint development with Northrop Grumman)
 APG-84 RACR radar
 ALE-50 towed decoy
 ALR-67(V)3 and ALR-69A radar warning receivers
 AN/APQ-181 (AESA upgrade currently in development), for the B-2 Spirit bomber
 Integrated Sensor Suite (ISS) for the RQ-4 Global Hawk UAV
 ASQ-228 ATFLIR (Advanced Targeting Forward-Looking Infrared) pod
 TPQ-36/TPQ-37 Firefinder and MPQ-64 Sentinel mobile battlefield radars
 F-16 RACR, designed for the F-16 using AESA technology
 SLQ-32 shipboard EW system
 Large fixed-site radars such as PAVE PAWS, BMEWS, and the Missile Defense Agency X-band Radar (XBR)

Satellite sensors
Raytheon, often in conjunction with Boeing, Lockheed Martin or Northrop Grumman, is also heavily involved in the satellite sensor business. Much of its Space and Airborne Systems division in El Segundo, CA is devoted to this, a business it inherited from Hughes. Examples of programs include:
 Space Tracking and Surveillance System (STSS), being developed for the Ballistic Missile Defense. Raytheon is building the sensor payload. Additionally, the El Segundo site is the company center of excellence for the development and production of laser products.
 Raytheon company's Navy Multiband Terminal (NMT) is the first advanced, next-generation satellite communications (SATCOM) system to successfully log on to and communicate with the U.S. government's Milstar SATCOM system using low and medium data rate waveforms. The system provides naval commanders and sailors with greater data capacity, as well as improved protection against enemy intercept and jamming.
 Visible Infrared Imaging Radiometer Suite (VIIRS), was developed by Raytheon Space and Airborne Sensors and is currently in operation on the Suomi NPP satellite.  Future deliveries of VIIRS will fly onboard JPSS to continue the operational space based climate and weather sensing legacy of the MODIS sensors.

Communications
 Raytheon's Universal Control System (UCS) is an unmanned aerial system (UAS) "cockpit" that improves operator awareness and efficiency, while providing the ability to control multiple unmanned aircraft, and reduce potential accidents.
 The company also makes several software radio and digital communication systems for military applications such as Cooperative Engagement Capability (CEC), is participating in Navy-Marine Corps Intranet (NMCI), ECHELON and the Joint Tactical Terminal (JTT) programs.
 Digital Multimedia Watchdog, a tool used by the FBI to record phone calls and Internet communications.

Radioactive materials detection system
As part of the company's growing homeland security business and strategic focus, Raytheon has teamed with other contractors to develop an Advance Spectroscopic Portal (ASP) to allow border officials to view and identify radioactive materials in vehicles and shipping containers more effectively.

Semiconductors
Raytheon also manufactures semiconductors for the electronics industry in sites in the US and UK. In the late 20th century it produced a wide range of integrated circuits and other components, but as of 2003 its US semiconductor business specializes in gallium arsenide (GaAs) components for radio communications as well as infrared detectors. It is also making efforts to develop gallium nitride (GaN) components for next-generation radars and radios. The UK arm specialized in CMOS on silicon carbide (SiC) development and foundry work but is no longer taking on new orders, having been on the premises for 57 years.

Missile defense systems
In the framework of Ground-Based Midcourse Defense, Raytheon is developing a Ground Based Interceptor (GBI) that includes a booster missile and a kinetic Exoatmospheric Kill Vehicle (EKV), along with several key radar components, such as the Sea-Based X-Band Radar (SBX) and the Upgraded Early Warning Radar (UEWR).

Missiles

Raytheon is a developer of missiles and related missile defense systems. These include:
 AGM-65 Maverick
 AGM-88 HARM
 AGM-129 Advanced Cruise Missile
 AGM-154 Joint Standoff Weapon
 AIM-7 Sparrow
 AIM-9 Sidewinder
 AIM-120 AMRAAM
 BGM-71 TOW
 BGM-109 Tomahawk
 FGM-148 Javelin
 FIM-92 Stinger
 GBU-28 Paveway III
 Peregrine air-to-air missile
 MIM-23 Hawk
 MIM-104 Patriot
 RIM-7 Sea Sparrow
 RIM-161 Standard Missile 3
 RIM-162 ESSM
 Pyros

Hi-tech simulators
In a jointly managed project with Hughes Aircraft Co., Raytheon developed the Air Warfare Simulation (AWSIM2), currently used by the USAF for battle staff training at simulation centers worldwide.

Raytheon also produces and runs the ABACUS (Advanced BAttlespace CompUter Simulation) or Higher Formation Trainer (HFT) for training HQs from small specialist units up to corps level.

Training Services and Learning Outsourcing
Raytheon Professional Services (RPS) is a global leader in training services and learning outsourcing for over 75 years. Clients are offered training tailored to their needs. The scope of each contract can vary from short-term training initiatives and projects to multi-year outsourcing engagements for some or all of a client’s training function. Services include: (1) Performance Consulting & Learning Strategy Development, (2) Training Design, Development & Delivery, (3) Learning Technologies and (4)Training Administration

Raytheon Six Sigma

Raytheon Six Sigma is the company's disciplined, knowledge-based approach designed to increase productivity, grow the business, enhance customer satisfaction and build a customer culture that embraces all of these goals. Daniel Burnham brought Six Sigma to Raytheon from AlliedSignal in 1998. This internal service provides six steps that guide projects to completion, the six steps being: visualize, commit, prioritize, characterize, improve, and achieve. Raytheon mentions in its annual reports the benefits it has enjoyed through Six Sigma. It has gained USD $3.8 billion in financial benefit and has set a common language and culture across the company.

Environmental record
Two lawsuits were filed against a Raytheon Company plant in St. Petersburg, Florida, due to concern with health risks, property values, and contamination in April 2008. Raytheon was given until the end of the month to independently test whether or not the groundwater that originated from its area was contaminated. According to the Florida Department of Environmental Protection (DEP), the groundwater contained carcinogenic contaminants, including trichloroethylene, 1,4-dioxane, and vinyl chloride. The DEP also reported that the clouds contained other toxins, such as lead and toluene.

In 1995, Raytheon acquired Dallas-based E-Systems, including a site in St. Petersburg, Florida. In November 1991, prior to Raytheon's acquisition, contamination had been discovered at the E-Systems site. Soil and groundwater had been contaminated with the volatile organic compounds trichloroethylene and 1,4-Dioxane. In 2005, groundwater monitoring indicated polluted groundwater was moving into areas outside the site. According to DEP documentation, Raytheon has tested wells on its site since 1996 but had not delivered a final report; therefore, it was given a deadline on May 31, 2008 to investigate its groundwater. Contamination in the area has not affected anyone's drinking water supply or health, yet due to negative local media coverage lawsuits are being filed with claims against Raytheon citing decreases in property values.

In another case, Raytheon was ordered by the Environmental Protection Agency (EPA) to treat groundwater at the Tucson Plant (acquired during the merger with Hughes) in Arizona since Raytheon used and disposed metals, chlorinated solvents, and other substances at the plant since 1951. The EPA further required the installation and operation of an oxidation process system to treat the solvents and make the water safe to drink.

On 9 August 2006, The Stream Contact Centre in Derry, Northern Ireland, which had a contract with Raytheon at the time, was attacked by protesters. They destroyed the computers, documents, and mainframe of the office, and proceeded to occupy it for eight hours prior to their arrest.

The activists were charged with criminal damage and affray. The trial of six of the accused began May 19, 2008, in the Laganside Courts in Belfast. Colm Bryce, Gary Donnelly, Kieran Gallagher, Michael Gallagher, Sean Heaton, Jimmy Kelly,  Paddy McDaid and Eamonn O'Donnell were acquitted of all charges on 11 June, with Eamonn McCann found guilty of the theft of two computer discs.

See also
 Raytheon 9
 Tactical Control System
 Top 100 US Federal Contractors – $16.1 billion in FY2009

References

External links 

 Raytheon Company website (Archived)

 Raytheon Company Semiconductor Division Files Kept to Monitor the Electronics Industry, 1965–1986 (call number M0661; 11.5 linear ft.) are housed in the Department of Special Collections and University Archives at Stanford University Libraries
 Direct political contributions

 
1922 establishments in Massachusetts
2020 disestablishments in Massachusetts
2020 mergers and acquisitions
Collier Trophy recipients
Aerospace companies of the United States
American companies disestablished in 2020
American companies established in 1922
Companies based in Waltham, Massachusetts
Companies formerly listed on the New York Stock Exchange
Defense companies of the United States
Defunct manufacturing companies based in Massachusetts
Defunct technology companies based in Massachusetts
Electronics companies established in 1922
Electronics companies disestablished in 2020
Electronics companies of the United States
Guided missile manufacturers
Manufacturing companies disestablished in 2020
Manufacturing companies established in 1922
Radar manufacturers
Superfund sites in California
Technology companies based in the Boston area
Technology companies disestablished in 2020
Vacuum tubes
Water pollution in the United States